Thomas Butler, 1st Baron Dunboyne (1271 – 9 October 1329) was the third son of Theobald Butler, 4th Chief Butler of Ireland and Joan FitzJohn.

Marriage and Children
He married Synolda le Petit, daughter of William le Petit      
 Piers Butler, 2nd Baron Dunboyne (1294-1370)

Career
In 1324 he was called to the Irish Parliament (as were intermittently his descendants in the succeeding two centuries before the creation of the Barony of Dunboyne as a lordship of Parliament by patent 1541). He was created 1st Baron Dunboyne in 1324, by prescription. He fought in the Battle of Ardnocher on 9 October 1329 and was killed in action by the Chief of the Clan Geoghegan.

See also
 Butler dynasty
 Baron Dunboyne

References

Thomas
14th-century Irish people
People from County Meath
Normans in Ireland
Barons Dunboyne
1271 births
1329 deaths